The Canal de la Sambre à l'Oise is a canal in northern France. It forms a connection between the canalised river Sambre (Meuse basin) at Landrecies and the Oise (Seine basin) at La Fère. The junction made at La Fère is with a branch of the Canal de Saint-Quentin, while the Canal latéral à l'Oise is joined 10.5 km further downstream at Chauny. The canal, also a popular waterway for boats heading south from the Netherlands and Belgium to the central French waterways, had to be closed in 2006 when two aqueducts were found to be in danger of failing. Funding has been put in place by the owner, Voies Navigables de France, and the local authorities, with support from the State. The canal was reopened in July 2021.

World War I battle 
The Sambre–Oise Canal saw one of the last Allied victories of World War I before the Armistice with Germany which came into effect at 11.00 am on 11 November 1918.

The forcing of the Sambre–Oise Canal took place on 4 November 1918. Participating in the operation were the 2nd Battalion Royal Sussex, as well as the 2nd Manchesters, to which the poet Wilfred Owen belonged. The Lancashire Fusiliers also took part in the battle. The British forces were to cross some fields surrounded by high hedges, then cross the canal at a point where there was a lockhouse. The Germans had this area defended with machine guns and rifle teams.

As the 2nd Battalion advanced on the canal, the Royal Engineers placed small footbridges across the lock. Some Royal Sussex Regiment men actually climbed up onto the lock gates, one of them firing his Lewis gun from the hip as he went. Eventually the British managed to take the lockhouse and pushed on to their final objective near the Étreux road.

Wilfred Owen, officer and poet, was killed as he crossed the Sambre–Oise Canal at the head of a raiding party: Owen's death occurred only a week before the war ended.

See also 
Battle of the Sambre (1918)

References

External links 
 Canal de la Sambre à l'Oise (and river Sambre) with maps and details of places, moorings and facilities for boats, by the author of Inland Waterways of France, Imray
 Navigation details for 80 French rivers and canals (French waterways website section)

Western Front (World War I)
Canals in France
Canals opened in 1839